Strictly Come Dancing returned for its tenth series and began with the launch show on 15 September 2012. The live shows commenced on 5 October. Fourteen celebrities took part – the same number as the previous year. Sir Bruce Forsyth and Tess Daly returned to present the main show on BBC One and Claudia Winkleman returned to present the results show with Daly. Zoë Ball returned to present spin-off show Strictly Come Dancing: It Takes Two. Judges Len Goodman, Bruno Tonioli and Craig Revel Horwood all returned and were joined on the judging panel by series 7 guest judge Darcey Bussell, who replaced Alesha Dixon. She would be permanent judge for seven series until 2018.

On 20 June 2012, it was announced that Katya Virshilas would not be returning to the show as a professional. On 23 June 2012, it was announced that Karen Hauer of Burn the Floor fame would replace Virshilas.

The show was broadcast from Wembley Arena on 17 November with all proceeds going to the BBC charity, Children in Need. The show on 10 November was hosted by Daly and Winkleman while Forsyth took a break before the Wembley Arena show.

Series 10 would be the final series of the show to be produced at the studios of the BBC Television Centre in West London. In March 2013 the Television Centre site was closed for redevelopment, with the production of future Strictly series moved to Elstree Studios.

Olympic gymnast Louis Smith and professional partner Flavia Cacace won the series on 22 December 2012. The final was also notable as Pasha Kovalev became the second male professional dancer to reach two consecutive finals, equaling the record of Ian Waite, Erin Boag, Lilia Kopylova and Aliona Vilani.

Couples
As with the previous series, 14 celebrities took part, the professionals were revealed on 23 June 2012 with Karen Hauer replacing the departing Katya Virshilas. The full line-up was revealed on 10 September 2012 on The One Show.

Johnny Ball was originally partnered with Aliona Vilani; however, following an injury sustained in training before the first live show, Iveta Lukosiute was hired as a replacement partner. This was officially intended as a short-term measure until Vilani was able to return; however, it was later confirmed that Lukosiute would be Ball's full-time partner. Ball remains the oldest contestant, with the age of 74 when he competed in the show.

Scoring chart

Average chart
This table only counts for dances scored on a traditional 40-point scale.

Couples' highest and lowest scoring dances

Highest and lowest scoring performances of the series 
The best and worst performances in each dance style according to the judges' scores are as follows:

 Johnny Ball is the only celebrity not to land on this list.

Weekly scores and songs
Unless indicated otherwise, individual judges scores in the charts below (given in parentheses) are listed in this order from left to right: Craig Revel Horwood, Darcey Bussell, Len Goodman, Bruno Tonioli.

Launch show
Musical guest: Mika—"Celebrate"

Week 1

Night 1 – Friday
Running order

Night 2 – Saturday
Running order

Week 2
Musical guest: Scissor Sisters—"Let's Have a Kiki"

Running order

Judges' votes to save

Horwood: Richard & Erin
Bussell: Richard & Erin
Tonioli: Richard & Erin
Goodman: Did not vote, but would have voted to save Richard & Erin

Week 3: Hollywood Week 
Musical guest: Dionne Warwick—"(There's) Always Something There to Remind Me"
Running order

Judges' votes to save

Horwood: Michael & Natalie
Bussell: Michael & Natalie
Tonioli: Jerry  & Anton 
Goodman: Michael & Natalie

Week 4: Halloween Night
Musical guest: Paloma Faith—"Never Tear Us Apart"

Running order

Judges' votes to save

Horwood: Colin & Kristina
Bussell: Colin & Kristina
Tonioli: Colin & Kristina
Goodman: Did not vote, but would have voted to save Sid & Ola.

Week 5
Musical guests: The Wanted—"I Found You"; Andrea Bocelli—"Nessun dorma"
Running order

Judges' votes to save

Horwood: Richard & Erin
Bussell: Richard & Erin
Tonioli: Richard & Erin
Goodman: Did not vote, but would have voted to save Richard & Erin.

Week 6
Musical guest: André Rieu and his Johann Strauss Orchestra

Running order

Judges' votes to save

Horwood: Kimberley & Pasha
Bussell: Kimberley & Pasha
Tonioli: Kimberley & Pasha
Goodman: Did not vote, but would have voted to save Kimberley & Pasha.

Week 7: Wembley (Dance Through the Decades)
Broadcast live from Wembley Arena
Musical guests: Kylie Minogue—"The Loco-Motion"; Girls Aloud—"Something New"

Running order

Judges' votes to save

Horwood: Nicky & Karen
Bussell: Nicky & Karen
Tonioli: Nicky & Karen
Goodman: Did not vote, but would have voted to save Nicky & Karen.

Week 8
Dance guests: Flawless performed to a Michael Jackson medley
Musical guest: The Script—"Hall of Fame"

Running order

Judges' votes to save

Horwood: Michael & Natalie
Bussell: Michael & Natalie
Tonioli: Michael & Natalie
Goodman: Did not vote, but would have voted to save Michael & Natalie.

Week 9
Musical guests: JLS—"Hold Me Down"; Alfie Boe—"Bridge over Troubled Water"
Running order

Judges' votes to save

Horwood: Nicky & Karen
Bussell: Nicky & Karen
Tonioli: Nicky & Karen
Goodman: Did not vote, but would have voted to save Nicky & Karen.

Week 10: Dance Fusion (Quarter-final)
Musical guest: Michael Bublé—"It's Beginning to Look a Lot Like Christmas"

Running order

Judges' votes to save

Horwood: Denise & James
Bussell: Denise & James
Tonioli: Denise & James
Goodman: Did not vote, but would have voted to save Denise & James.

Week 11: Semi-Final
Musical guest: Katherine Jenkins—"Santa Baby"
Dance guests: Katherine Jenkins & Mark Ballas performed the Jive
Running order

Judges' votes to save
Horwood: Denise & James
Bussell: Denise & James
Tonioli: Denise & James
Goodman: Did not vote, but would have voted to save Denise & James.

Week 12: Final 
Musical guest: Robbie Williams—"Different"

Show 1
Running order

Show 2
Running order

Dance chart
 Highest scoring dance
 Lowest scoring dance

Week 1: Cha-Cha-Cha or Waltz
Week 2: One unlearned dance (introducing Foxtrot, Jive, Salsa and Viennese Waltz)
Week 3 (Hollywood night): One unlearned dance (introducing Argentine Tango, Charleston, Quickstep, Rumba and Tango)
Week 4 (Halloween night): One unlearned dance (introducing American Smooth and Paso Doble)
Week 5: One unlearned dance (introducing Samba)
Week 6: One unlearned dance
Week 7 (Dance Through the Decades – Wembley week): One unlearned dance
Weeks 8 & 9: One unlearned dance
Week 10 (Dance Fusion week): One dance consisting of two different styles
Week 11: Two unlearned dances
Week 12 (Show 1): Judges' choice and showdance
Week 12 (Show 2): Couple's favourite dance of the series

Ratings
Weekly ratings for each show on BBC One. All numbers are in millions and provided by BARB. Series average excludes the launch show.

References

External links

Season 10
2012 British television seasons